Autódromo Eduardo Copello, better known as El Zonda, is a  motorsports circuit located in the defile Quebrada de Zonda in San Juan, Argentina. Mainly known for hosting TC 2000/Súper TC 2000 races, but there have also been Top Race V6, Turismo Nacional and other national series at this circuit.

El Zonda was inaugurated in 1967 and today it receive his name in honor of the driver Eduardo Copello, born in San Juan.

Lap records 

The official race lap records at the Autódromo Eduardo Copello are listed as:

References 

Motorsport venues in San Juan Province, Argentina
Sport in Santiago del Estero Province
Buildings and structures in Santiago del Estero Province